Gjorge Ivanov (born 2 May 1960) is a Macedonian politician, who served as the 4th President of North Macedonia from 2009 to 2019.

Early and personal life
Born at Valandovo, Ivanov finished primary and secondary school in his hometown. He lived there until the age of 27, then moved to Skopje, Yugoslavia which has since been his permanent residence.

Ivanov is married to Maja Ivanova. Together they have a son named Ivan.

Political and civil society activism 
Ivanov has been politically active since the Yugoslav era, when he pushed for political pluralism and market economy.
Until 1990 he was an activist in the League of Socialist Youth of Yugoslavia and a member of the last presidency of the organisation, where he worked on reforming the political system and promoting political plurality and free market economy.

Ivanov is considered a leading expert on civil society, specialising in political management. He is the founder and honorary president of the Macedonian Political Science Association and one of the founding members of the Institute for Democracy Societas Civilis, a leading analytical centre in North Macedonia.

Academic career 
His professional career began in 1988, when he became an editor at the Macedonian Radio and Television, the national broadcasting station. He later taught political theory and political philosophy at the Law Faculty of the University of Skopje. In 1999, he became a visiting professor for the Southeast European programme at the University of Athens in Greece.

A series of academic appointments followed, including at universities in Bologna and Sarajevo. Ss. Cyril and Methodius University of Skopje named him associate professor in 1992 and a full-time professor in 2008. The same year, he became president of the Council for Accreditation in Higher Education in Macedonia.

Published works
 Цивилно општество (Civil Society)
 Демократијата во поделените општества: македонскиот модел (Democracy in divided societes: the Macedonian Model)
 Современи политички теории (Current political theories)
 Политички теории - Антика (Political theories - Antiquity)

President of the Republic of Macedonia

Campaign and election

On 25 January 2009, the strongest party in the Macedonian parliament, VMRO-DPMNE, appointed Ivanov as the party's presidential candidate for the 2009 Macedonian presidential election. 1,016 party delegates voted for his candidacy at the party's convention. Although he was proposed as a candidate by VMRO-DPMNE, he is not a member of the party.

During his campaign, Ivanov announced that if he is going to be elected president, he would "insist on a meeting between the President of the Republic of Macedonia and the President of the Republic of Greece" and that one of his highest priorities is the resolution of the country's long-running name dispute with Greece.

In the first round of the 2009 Macedonian presidential election 343,374 (35.06%) citizens of The Republic Of Macedonia voted for Ivanov, the second being the candidate of the Social Democrats, Ljubomir Frčkoski, with 20.45% of the votes.

Ivanov won the second round of the presidential election with 453,616 votes; opposition candidate Ljubomir Frčkoski got 264,828 votes.

One day after his election, Ivanov reaffirmed his intention for a meeting to be realised between him and the president of Greece, Karolos Papoulias. He added that he will officialise his invitation just after taking office. After a meeting with the president of the Democratic Union for Integration, Ali Ahmeti, Ivanov announced that he will also include ethnic Albanian intellectuals in his future presidential cabinet.

On 16 April, Ivanov on a ceremony received the presidential certificate from the State Election Commission.

Inauguration

Ivanov took office on 12 May 2009, thereby succeeding Branko Crvenkovski. After taking the oath he held his inauguration speech in the Macedonian parliament and made public his priorities - EU and NATO membership, economic recovery, inner stability, interethnic relations and good relations with the neighbouring countries, especially with Greece.

The swearing-in ceremony was attended by Crvenkovski, prime minister Nikola Gruevski, the first president of independent Republic of Macedonia Kiro Gligorov, military officials, leaders of the religious communities in Macedonia and foreign ambassadors in the county.

Also, four foreign statesmen were present — the president of Serbia Boris Tadić, the president of Montenegro Filip Vujanović, the president of Croatia Stjepan Mesić and the president of Albania Bamir Topi. Later that day Ivanov held bilateral talks with the four presidents.

The second inauguration of President Ivanov was held on 12 May 2014 in the Macedonian parliament The swearing-in ceremony was attended the prime minister Nikola Gruevski, military officials, leaders of the religious communities in Macedonia and foreign ambassadors in the county. The inauguration was boycotted by the Democratic Union for Integration the largest Albanian political party in the Republic of Macedonia and the Social Democratic Union of Macedonia the largest opposition party in Macedonia.

First term

On the day Ivanov officially became president of his country, he sent a letter to the president of the United States Barack Obama in which he underlined The Republic Of Macedonia's aim to join NATO and EU and to find a "mutually acceptable solution" to the "name difference" with neighbouring Greece. He also thanked Obama for his words of support at the 2009 NATO Summit.

One day after the inauguration, Ivanov together with Prime Minister Gruevski travelled to Brussels to meet with European Union and NATO officials.

Ivanov claims to promote a Macedonian model of a multi-ethnic society and Pax Europaea, a united Europe living in peace and respecting the diversity and identity of the nations of Europe.

Second term 

Ivanov was re-elected as President of the Republic of Macedonia for a second term in April 2014.

In March 2016 Ivanov stated that the European Union had failed the Republic of Macedonia and other Balkan countries in the European migrant crisis.

On 12 April 2016 Ivanov halted judicial inquiries into officials involved in a wiretap scandal. Ivanov stated to have done so in the best interest of the country, and to end the political crisis. A move that the opposition called Ivanov's coup d'état and an effective disagreement to cooperate and find a common ground solution to the problem. His own party, the VMRO-DPMNE did not agree with his action. Opposition media called it a political manoeuvre to prevent further judicial inquiry by the special prosecutor Katica Janeva, proposed by the international community to normalise the political situation. Opposition leader Zoran Zaev subsequently called for protests. A demonstration occurred in Skopje on 13 April, with the presidential offices being attacked by rioters and several people detained.

Awards and honours

Honours
2011- Highest decoration of the Order of “Saint Lazarus” of Jerusalem
2012- Order of the European Movement of Bosnia and Herzegovina
2013- Imperial Knight of Honor of the Order of St. George  from House of Habsburg
2015- Honorary Citizen of Pustec
2015- Order Baptist (Preteca) from Saint Jovan Bigorski Monastery
2015- Jubilee Medal "70 Years of Victory in the Great Patriotic War 1941–1945" from Russian Federation

Awards
2011-Recognition for leadership in reducing disaster risk from the International Strategy for Disaster Reduction of the United Nations
2012- Peace and Sport' award from Peace and Sport International Forum
2014- The Fund for American Studies (TFAS) Freedom Award
2014- Prix de la Fondation from Crans Montana Forum
2016- Isa Beg Ishaković international award from Isa Beg Ishaković Foundation
2017- Flame of peace award from the Association for the Furtherance of Peace
2017 - Patriarch Alexey II of Moscow Award from International Public Foundation for the Unity of Orthodox Christian Nations

Professor/doctor honoris causa

See also

 List of state visits made by Gjorge Ivanov

References

External links

 Official website of the President of North Macedonia
 Official website of Ivanov's presidential candidacy

1960 births
Eastern Orthodox Christians from North Macedonia
Living people
Members of the Macedonian Orthodox Church
People from Valandovo
Presidents of North Macedonia
VMRO-DPMNE politicians
Ss. Cyril and Methodius University of Skopje alumni